The Essential REO Speedwagon is a greatest hits album by the band REO Speedwagon released through Epic Records and Legacy Recordings. The collection spans the band's history from 1971 through 1999 and the package includes two compact discs. The album consists of tracks from nearly every studio album up to 1999 except "This Time We Mean It" from 1975.

In 2009, the album was re-released as part of the Limited Edition 3.0 series which added a third bonus disc with eight more tracks.

Track listing

The Essential REO Speedwagon

The Essential REO Speedwagon [3.0] 

Note: The Essential REO Speedwagon [3.0] has the same tracks above with an added CD with eight more tracks.

Personnel 
Kevin Cronin – Vocals (Disc 01: tracks 02-04, 06-15/All tracks on Disc 02 & 03); Rhythm guitar, Acoustic Guitar, and Piano on various tracks
Gary Richrath – lead guitars (All tracks on Disc 01/Disc 02: 01-15/Disc 03: 01-07)
Gregg Philbin – Bass (Disc 01: tracks 01-12/Disc 03: 06)
Neal Doughty – Keyboards (All tracks)
Alan Gratzer – Drums (All tracks on Disc 01/Disc 02: 01-15/Disc 03: 01-07)
Terry Luttrell – Lead Vocals (Disc 01: track 01)
Mike Murphy – Lead Vocals (Disc 01: track 05)
Bruce Hall – Bass (Disc 01: tracks 13-15/All tracks on Disc 02/Disc 03: 01-05, 07-08), Lead vocals on "Back on the Road Again"
Dave Amato – Lead guitar (Disc 02: tracks 16-18/Disc 03: 08)
Bryan Hitt – Drums (Disc 02: tracks 16-18/Disc 03: 08)
Jesse Harms – Keyboards (Disc 02: tracks 16/Disc: 03: 08)

Release history

References

External links
The Essential at Allmusic.com
The Essential 3.0 at Allmusic.com

2004 greatest hits albums
REO Speedwagon albums
Epic Records compilation albums